The Florida House of Representatives is the lower house of the Florida Legislature, the state legislature of the U.S. state of Florida, the Florida Senate being the upper house. Article III, Section 1 of the Constitution of Florida, adopted in 1968, defines the role of the Legislature and how it is to be constituted. The House is composed of 120 members, each elected from a single-member district with a population of approximately 180,000 residents. Legislative districts are drawn on the basis of population figures, provided by the federal decennial census. Representatives' terms begin immediately upon their election. 

The Republicans hold a majority in the State House with 84 seats; Democrats are in the minority with 35 seats. One seat is vacant.

Titles
Members of the House of Representatives are referred to as representatives. Because this shadows the terminology used to describe members of U.S. House of Representatives, constituents and the news media often refer to members as state representatives to avoid confusion with their federal counterparts.

Terms
Article III of the Florida Constitution defines the terms for state legislators.

The Constitution requires state representatives to be elected for two-year terms.

Upon election, legislators take office immediately.

Term limits
On November 3, 1992, almost 77 percent of Florida voters backed Amendment 9, the Florida Term Limits Amendment, which amended the state Constitution, to enact eight-year term limits on federal and state officials. Under the Amendment, former members can be elected again after a break. In 1995, the U.S. Supreme Court ruled that states could not enact congressional term limits, but ruled that the state level term limits remain.

Qualifications
Florida legislators must be at least twenty-one years old, an elector and resident of their district, and must have resided in Florida for at least two years prior to election.

Legislative session
Each year during which the Legislature meets constitutes a new legislative session.

Committee weeks
Legislators start Committee activity in September of the year prior to the regular legislative session. Because Florida is a part-time legislature, this is necessary to allow legislators time to work their bills through the committee process, prior to the regular legislative session.

Regular legislative session
The Florida Legislature meets in a 60-day regular legislative session each year. Regular legislative sessions in odd-numbered years must begin on the first Tuesday after the first Monday in March. Under the state Constitution, the Legislature can begin even-numbered year regular legislative sessions at a time of its choosing.

Prior to 1991, the regular legislative session began in April. Senate Joint Resolution 380 (1989) proposed to the voters a constitutional amendment (approved November 1990) that shifted the starting date of regular legislative session from April to February. Subsequently, Senate Joint Resolution 2606 (1994) proposed to the voters a constitutional amendment (approved November 1994) shifting the start date to March, where it remains. The reason for the "first Tuesday after the first Monday" requirement stems back to the time when regular legislative session began in April. regular legislative session could start any day from April 2 through April 8, but never on April 1 – April Fool's Day. In recent years, the Legislature has opted to start in January in order to allow lawmakers to be home with their families during school spring breaks, and to give more time ahead of the legislative elections in the Fall.

Organizational session
On the fourteenth day following each general election, the Legislature meets for an organizational session to organize and select officers.

Special session
Special legislative sessions may be called by the governor, by a joint proclamation of the Senate president and House speaker, or by a three-fifths vote of all legislators. During any special session the Legislature may only address legislative business that is within the purview of the purpose or purposes stated in the special session proclamation.

Powers and process
The Florida House is authorized by the Florida Constitution to create and amend the laws of the U.S. state of Florida, subject to the governor's power to veto legislation. To do so, legislators propose legislation in the forms of bills drafted by a nonpartisan, professional staff. Successful legislation must undergo committee review, three readings on the floor of each house, with appropriate voting majorities, as required, and either be signed into law by the governor or enacted through a veto override approved by two-thirds of the membership of each legislative house.

Its statutes, called "chapter laws" or generically as "slip laws" when printed separately, are compiled into the Laws of Florida and are called "session laws". The Florida Statutes are the codified statutory laws of the state.

In 2009, legislators filed 2,138 bills for consideration. On average, the Legislature has passed about 300 bills into law annually.

In 2013, the Legislature filed about 2,000 bills. About 1,000 of these are "member bills." The remainder are bills by committees responsible for certain functions, such as budget. In 2016, about 15% of the bills were passed.
In 2017, 1,885 lobbyists registered to represent 3,724 entities.

The House also has the power to propose amendments to the Florida Constitution. Additionally, the House has the exclusive power to impeach officials, who are then tried by the Senate.

Leadership
The House is headed by a speaker, elected by the members of the House to a two-year term. The speaker presides over the House, appoints committee members and committee chairs, influences the placement of bills on the calendar, and rules on procedural motions. The speaker pro tempore presides if the speaker leaves the chair or if there is a vacancy. The speaker, along with the Senate president and governor of Florida, control most of the agenda of state business in Florida.

The majority and minority caucus each elect a leader.

Composition

Members, 2022–2024

District map

Past composition of the House of Representatives 

From 1874 to 1996, the Democratic Party held majorities in the Florida House of Representatives. Following sizable GOP gains in the 1994 election, which significantly reduced the Democratic Party majority in the Florida House, Republicans captured a majority in the 1996 election. The Republican Party has been the majority party since that time in the House.

Additional information on the past composition of the Florida House of Representatives can be found in Allen Morris's The Florida Handbook (various years, published every two years for many years).

Notable people
 

C. A. Roberts (1903–1973), Florida state legislator

See also
Florida Democratic Party
Elections in Florida
Florida State Capitol
Government of Florida
List of speakers of the Florida House of Representatives
Republican Party of Florida
The Florida Channel

References

External links

Official Site Florida House
Official Site Florida Elections Division
The House Journal, the official record of actions taken by the House and its committees, full text online in the University of Florida's Digital Collections

 
Florida Legislature
Government of Florida
1839 establishments in Florida Territory
State lower houses in the United States